The Lycée Français de New York (LFNY), commonly called the Lycée (in English, "The French High School of New York"), is an independent bilingual French school serving an international community of students from Nursery-3 to twelfth grade based in Manhattan, New York City. The Lycée is accredited by the New York State Association of Independent Schools and the French Ministry of Education, though it receives no funding from the French government.

The Lycée offers a standard French curriculum taught by French-trained teachers. In parallel, students follow an American program, taught by U.S.-trained teachers, similar to what is found in New York City independent schools. Students study for the French general Baccalauréat, the international option of the French Baccalaureate, or a special Franco-American Baccalaureate (BFA), as well as the American High School Diploma. The school has over 1350 students from more than 65 different nationalities. The student to teacher ratio is approximately 7:1.

Lycée graduates often attend top colleges and universities around the world with about 50 percent staying in the United States, 25 percent going to Canada, 10 percent to the UK, 10 percent to France, and a growing number attending international joint programs such as Columbia-Sciences Po.

History

In the mid-1930s the Lycée was the brainchild of the then French Consul General in New York, Comte Charles de Ferry de Fontnouvelle. He enlisted the help of Forsythe Wicks, a lawyer and businessman who was the president of the Alliance Française, and Paul Windels, Sr., the Attorney General of the City of New York. Others involved in the founding of the Lycée include Dr. Nicholas Murray Butler, the President of Columbia University, Mr. Jesse Straus, the U.S. Ambassador to France, and Mr. Jean Marx, the Director of Cultural Affairs at the Quai d'Orsay. The Lycée granted its first baccalaureate degree in 1938. Since 1935 over 36,000 students have studied at the Lycée, and more than 150 nationalities have been represented throughout the School's history. During the late 1930s and 1940s especially, world events helped shape the School as it continued to expand to accommodate the many students who came to New York from Europe and elsewhere during WWII. Eight graduates of the Lycée Français de New York died in combat during the war. 

De Fontnouvelle served as the school's first President from 1935 until his death in 1956. He was succeeded by two interim presidents: Jean de Siéyès (president or former president of the French-American Banking Corporation) from de Fontnouvelle's death until the end of the school year; and Robert Lacour-Gayet (a writer and academic) for the next school year. Then, Mr. Maurice Galy (deceased 1993) became the school's President starting in 1957, a post he held until he retired in 1989.

Curriculum
The school curriculum parallels the academic program laid out by the French Ministry of National Education and used in French schools throughout the world. This curriculum is supplemented by the essential elements advanced in American private-school education. 

LFNY Students pursue their post-secondary education in US, Canadian, French and British universities and colleges.

Facilities
The school originally occupied a residential building at 3 East 95th Street near Fifth Avenue (Mrs. Amory S. Carhart House), and Mr. Galy arranged for the acquisition of three more landmark mansions, two on East 72nd Street (Henry T. Sloane House and Oliver Gould Jennings House) and one on East 93rd Street (Mrs. Graham Fair Vanderbilt House)." In 2003, the school completed a modern, 158,000-square-foot (14,700 m2) state-of-the-art facility located at 505 East 75th Street. Taking up nearly a full city block, it houses the upper and lower schools and features such amenities as a 354-seat auditorium and two full-size gymnasiums.

The modern Lycée building was designed by the New York-based architecture firm Polshek Partnership Architects (now Ennead) in 2003. It consists of two LEED-certified buildings linked together by a patio, serving as a walkway, but also a lawn where students congregate and play. The North building (76th street) houses the pre-school and elementary schools while the middle school and high school students are taught in the South building (75th street). All students share the cafeteria, the auditorium and two gymnasiums. The facade of the building is made of stainless glass, and the exterior walls are dedicated to great writers, artists, scientists, philosophers and activists of Francophone and American thought.

The building was actually re-modeled from what had previously been a Volkswagen Car Dealership and five-story garage from at least the early 1970s through the 1980s (the exact year that dealership closed is unknown).

In 2016, the Lycée opened its new York Wing, a 19,000 square-foot addition, on York Avenue. The Wing has enabled a transformation of the school's program with technology-enhanced classrooms, a Media Lab with a working television studio and recording equipment, as well as a Makerspace, with equipment for carpentry, 3D printing, laser-cutting, and robotics. Dedicated faculty trained in the use of media, technology and fabrication work with existing faculty to integrate these spaces into the curriculum (These resources are however rarely used by members of the student body).

Cultural Center of the Lycée
The Lycée's Cultural Center keeps a year-round calendar filled with guest performances for students of all ages, as well as lectures and workshops led by thinkers and innovators in fields as diverse as the arts, science, technology and the humanities. Most notably, the Cultural Center’s Artists-in-Residence program brings renowned working artists to the campus three times a year to engage an entire grade in a creative endeavor—from circus arts to music, writing and illustration—over the course of a week.

Throughout the school year, the Cultural Center offers a program of evening and weekend events and activities focused on French and Francophone culture. This program is open to the public, and includes free film screenings once a month and regular panels on topics of global import to our times. Three times a year the Cultural Center presents music concerts featuring leading French and Francophone artists in jazz, classical and world music. Guests have included Ayo, Cécile McLorin Salvant, Francis Cabrel and Camille Bertault.

Student body

As of 2018, about 25 percent of students were solely French citizens, 20 percent were solely American citizens, 30 percent were French-American dual citizens, 20 percent possessed French, American and a third or fourth nationality, and 10 percent had neither French nor American nationality. In addition to French and English, students speak an additional 30 languages collectively.

While campaigning to represent the first constituency for French residents overseas, Julien Balkany criticized the school for prioritizing the children of American celebrities—including Madonna, Angelina Jolie, and Donald Trump—over the children of French citizens for admissions.

Tuition
The Lycée Français de New York has a tuition of $40,500. Financial Aid (bourses de scolarité) is given to students based on need. The Lycée is a private, independent school and receives no funding from the French government; however, children of French citizens are eligible for tuition grants from the French State based on need. These are independent from the Lycée's own financial aid program and are allocated directly to the families, not the school. The Lycée holds a yearly Gala to raise money to support financial aid, among other things.

See also
 Agence pour l'enseignement français à l'étranger
 Education in France
 American School of Paris - An American international school in France

References

1. "Le lycée français de New York prépare les élèves aux meilleures universités américaines"

2. "Lycée Français, a School Where French Is a Way of Life"

External links
 Lycée Français de New York website
 Alumni Association of the Lycée Français de New York (Fondée en 1964 par les Anciens, pour les Anciens)

AEFE accredited schools
French-American culture in New York City
Private K-12 schools in Manhattan
Educational institutions established in 1935
1935 establishments in New York City
French international schools in the United States
International schools in New York City
Yorkville, Manhattan
Bilingual schools in the United States